Śrem may refer to the following places in Poland:
Śrem, a town in Greater Poland Voivodeship (central Poland)
Śrem, Polkowice County in Lower Silesian Voivodeship (south-west Poland)
Śrem, Ząbkowice Śląskie County in Lower Silesian Voivodeship (south-west Poland)
Śrem, Międzychód County in Greater Poland Voivodeship (west-central Poland)